The 2021 TCR Australia Series (known for sponsorship reasons as the 2021 Supercheap Auto TCR Australia Series) was an Australian motor racing competition for TCR Touring Cars. It was the second TCR Australia Touring Car Series. The series was sanctioned by Motorsport Australia as a National Series with the Australian Racing Group Pty Ltd appointed as the Category Manager. It was contested as part of the renamed Motorsport Australia Championships series.

The series was won by Chaz Mostert driving an Audi RS 3 LMS TCR.

Race calendar
The calendar was announced on 23 November 2020 with seven confirmed rounds.

 – The Phillip Island round was postponed to 12−14 March from its original February 18-21 date after a snap lockdown was enacted in response to an outbreak of COVID-19 cases in Melbourne.

Teams and drivers

The following teams and drivers are under contract to compete in the 2021 series:

Summary

Drivers' standings 
Points system
Points are awarded as follows at each event. Drivers are required to finish a race in order to receive points.

 2 points are awarded for qualifying on pole position.
 At the final round, the Race 3 points scale was also used for Race 1.

Standings

Notes

References

External links 
Official website

TCR Australia
Australia